The order of precedence in Brazil is a symbolic hierarchy of officials used to direct protocol. It is regulated by Presidential Decree number 70.274 of March 9, 1972, signed by former President Emilio Medici. The following order applies to ceremonies hosted by the federal government.

This formal order of precedence was established during the military dictatorship, and hasn't been amended after the country's return to democracy in the 1980s. However, changes have informally been introduced to it, so that the de jure precedence no longer corresponds to the de facto arrangements that prevail in current practice. For instance, the head of the military cabinet, the head of the intelligence service and general officers of the Armed Forces no longer enjoy a precedence as high as is assigned to them by the 1972 Decree.

Other modifications of the order of precedence arise from the fact that certain officers, such as the Chief of Staff to the President, the Solicitor-General, etc., have been granted by law the status of Ministers of State, and so the holders of such officers now have a higher rank than they would have otherwise.

The order of precedence is only used to indicate ceremonial protocol; it does not reflect the co-equal status of the branches of government under the Constitution, and is not an actual hierarchy. The ranking of Brazilian officers in the Order of Precedence also does not reflect the place of those officers in the presidential line of succession.

The placement of Roman Catholic Cardinals in the order of precedence in spite of the separation of church and state in force in Brazil is justified on the grounds that they are Princes of a foreign power (the Holy See) residing in Brazil and/or holding Brazilian nationality. However Cardinals are no longer ascribed as high a precedence as the 1972 Decree ascribes to them, being in current practice outranked for instance by the presidents of the Chamber of Deputies, of the Federal Senate, of the Federal Supreme Court and by the attorney general of the Republic, as well as by former presidents of the Republic and by the Ministers of State.

Order of precedence according to the Decree
The President of the Republic (Luiz Inácio Lula da Silva)
The Vice President of the Republic (Geraldo Alckmin)
Brazilian cardinals (by seniority of assuming title)
Geraldo Majella Agnelo (Archbishop Emeritus of Salvador) 
Odilo Pedro Scherer (Archbishop of São Paulo) 
Raymundo Damasceno Assis (Archbishop Emeritus of Aparecida) 
João Braz de Aviz (Prefect of Congregation for Institutes of Consecrated Life and Societies of Apostolic Life in Vatican City) 
Orani João Tempesta (Archbishop of Rio de Janeiro) 
Sérgio da Rocha (Archbishop of Salvador)
Leonardo Ulrich Steiner (Archbishop of Manaus) 
Paulo Cezar Costa (Archbishop of Brasília)
Ambassadors Extraordinary and Plenipotentiary of foreign diplomatic mission to Brazil
The President of the Federal Senate and of the National Congress (Rodrigo Pacheco)
The President of the Chamber of Deputies (Arthur Lira)
The President of the Supreme Federal Court (Rosa Weber)
Former Presidents of Brazil (by seniority of assuming office, as long as they don't have other public office)
José Sarney (21 April 1985 – 15 March 1990)
Fernando Collor de Mello (15 March 1990 – 29 December 1992)
Fernando Henrique Cardoso (1 January 1995 – 1 January 2003)
Dilma Rousseff (1 January 2011 – 31 August 2016)
Michel Temer (31 August 2016 – 1 January 2019)
Jair Bolsonaro (1 January 2019 – 1 January 2023)
Former Vice Presidents of Brazil (by seniority of assuming office, as long as they don't have other public office)
Hamilton Mourão (1 January 2019 – 1 January 2023)
Ministers of State (by order of creation)
Minister of Justice and Public Security (Flávio Dino)
Minister of Foreign Affairs (Mauro Vieira)
Minister of Finance (Fernando Haddad)
Minister of Agriculture, Livestock and Supply (Carlos Fávaro)
Minister of Education (Camilo Santana)
Minister of Labour and Employments (Luiz Marinho)
Minister of Health (Nísia Trindade)
Minister of Mines and Energy (Alexandre Silveira)
Minister of Communications (Juscelino Filho)
Minister of the Environment and Climate Change (Marina Silva)
Minister of Science, Technology and Innovation (Luciana Santos)
Minister of Human Rights and Citizenship (Silvio Almeida)
Minister of Defence (José Múcio)
Minister of Tourism (Daniela Carneiro)
Minister of Integration and Regional Development (Waldez Góes)
Minister of Indigenous People (Sônia Guajajara)
Minister of Racial Equality (Anielle Franco)
Minister of Women (Cida Gonçalves)
Minister of Transport (Renan Filho)
Minister of Ports and Airports (Márcio França)
Minister of Culture (Margareth Menezes)
Minister of Sports (Ana Moser)
Minister of Social Development, Assistance, Family and Fight against Hunger (Wellington Dias)
Minister of Fishing and Aquaculture (André de Paula)
Minister of Management and Innovation in Public Services (Esther Dweck)
Minister of Social Security (Carlos Lupi)
Minister of Agrarian Development and Family Agriculture (Paulo Teixeira)
Minister of Cities (Jader Barbalho Filho)
Minister of Development, Industry, Trade and Services (Geraldo Alckmin)
The Head of the Institutional Security Bureau (Marco Edson Gonçalves Dias)
The Chief of Staff (Rui Costa)
The Director of the Brazilian Intelligence Agency (Saulo Moura)
The Commanders of the Armed Forces (by creation of branch)
Commander of the Brazilian Navy (Adm. Marcos Sampaio Olsen)
Commander of the Brazilian Army (Gen. Tomás Miguel Ribeiro Paiva)
Commander of the Brazilian Air Force (Lt. Brig. Marcelo Kanitz Damasceno)
Chief of the Joint Staff of the Armed Forces (Adm. Renato Rodrigues de Aguiar Freire)
Secretary-General of the Ministry of Defence (Gen. João Alberto Nunes de Paula)
The Attorney General of Brazil (Jorge Messias)
Foreign envoys
The President of the Superior Electoral Court (Alexandre de Moraes)
Justices of the Supreme Federal Court
Gilmar Mendes
Ricardo Lewandowski
Cármen Lúcia
Dias Toffoli
Luiz Fux
Luís Roberto Barroso
Edson Fachin
Alexandre de Moraes
Nunes Marques
André Mendonça
Prosecutor General of the Republic (Augusto Aras)
Governors of State (by creation date)
Governor of Bahia (Jerônimo Rodrigues)
Governor of Rio de Janeiro (Cláudio Castro)
Governor of Maranhão (Carlos Brandão)
Governor of Pará (Helder Barbalho)
Governor of Pernambuco (Raquel Lyra)
Governor of Minas Gerais (Romeu Zema)
Governor of São Paulo (Tarcísio de Freitas)
Governor of Goiás (Ronaldo Caiado)
Governor of Mato Grosso (Mauro Mendes)
Governor of Rio Grande do Sul (Eduardo Leite)
Governor of Ceará (Izolda Cela)
Governor of Paraíba (João Azevedo)
Governor of Espírito Santo (Elmano de Freitas)
Governor of Piauí (Rafael Fonteles)
Governor of Rio Grande do Norte (Fátima Bezerra)
Governor of Santa Catarina (Jorginho Mello)
Governor of Alagoas (Paulo Dantas)
Governor of Sergipe (Fábio Mitidieri)
Governor of Amazonas (Wilson Lima)
Governor of Paraná (Ratinho Júnior)
Governor of Acre (Gladson Cameli)
Governor of Mato Grosso do Sul (Eduardo Riedel)
Governor of Rondônia (Marcos Rocha)
Governor of Tocantins (Wanderlei Barbosa)
Governor of Roraima (Antonio Denarium)
Governor of Amapá (Clécio Luís)
The Governor of the Federal District (Ibaneis Rocha)
Senators
Federal Deputies
Admirals of the Brazilian Navy
Marshals of the Brazilian Army
Marshals of the air of the Brazilian Air Force
Admirals of the fleet of the Brazilian Navy
Generals of the Brazilian Army
Ambassadors
Lt. Brigadiers of the Brazilian Air Force
The President of the Superior Court of Justice (Maria Thereza Moura)
The President of the Superior Military Court (Lt. Brig. Joseli Camelo)
The President of the Federal Court of Accounts (Bruno Dantas)
The President of the Superior Labour Court (Emmanoel Pereira)
Justices of the Superior Electoral Court
Chargé d'affaires of foreign countries
Justices of the Superior Justice Court
Justices of the Superior Military Court
Justices of the Superior Labour Court
Vice admirals of the Brazilian Navy
Divisional generals of the Brazilian Army
Major-brigadiers of the Brazilian Air Force
Catholic Archbishops
The President of the Justice Court of the Federal District and Territories (José Cruz Macedo)
Secretaries-General of the Federal Senate and the Chamber of Deputies
Prosecutors of the Republic in the States of the Union
Prosecutors-General in the States of the Union
Directors of the Ministries of State
Deans of Federal Universities
The Director General of the Federal Police of Brazil (Andrei Rodrigues)
The President of the Central Bank of Brazil (Roberto Campos Neto)
The Chairwoman of the Bank of Brazil (Tarciana Medeiros)
The President of the Brazilian Development Bank (Aloizio Mercadante)
The Secretary of the Federal Revenue Service (Robinson Sakiyama)
Chairperson of Federal Savings Bank (Maria Rita Serrano)
Mayors of cities with more than 1,000,000 of inhabitants
Counter admirals of the Brazilian Navy
Brigadier-Generals of the Brazilian Army
Brigadiers of the Brazilian Air Force
Vice Governors of the States of the Union
Presidents of the Legislative Assemblies of the States of the Union
Presidents of the Justice Courts of the States of the Union
Chair of the Permanent Committee of the Book of the Merit 
Chair of the Brazilian Academy of Letters (Merval Pereira)
Chair of the Brazilian Academy of Sciences (Luiz Davidovich)
Chair of the Brazilian Association of Press (Paulo Jerônimo)
Deans of State and Private Universities
State Secretaries
Catholic Bishops
Presidents of Employers' and Workers' Confederations in national scale
Directors of Central Bank of Brazil
Directors of Bank of Brazil
Directors of Brazilian Development Bank
Captains of sea and war of the Brazilian Navy
Colonels of the Brazilian Army
Colonels of the Brazilian Air Force
State Deputies
Commanders of the Military Polices of the States of the Union
Desembargadores of the Justice Courts of the States of the Union
Foreign consuls
Federal Judges
Catholic Monsignors
Frigate captains of the Brazilian Navy
Lt. Colonels of the Brazilian Army
Lt. Colonels of the Brazilian Air Force
Presidents of Employers' and Workers' Confederations in regional or state scale
Presidents of Municipal Chambers in cities with more than 500,000 inhabitants
Law Judges
Public Prosecutors
Department Heads of Federal Universities
Mayors of cities with more than 100,000 inhabitants
Corvette captains of the Brazilian Navy
Majors of the Brazilian Army
Majors of the Brazilian Air Force
Department Heads of State and Private Universities
Presidents of Municipal Chambers of cities with more than 100,000 inhabitants
Universities professors
Other Mayors
Catholic Canons
Lt. Captains of the Brazilian Navy
Captains of the Brazilian Army
Captains of the Brazilian Air Force
Presidents of other Municipal Chambers
Catholic Priests
Principals of High Schools
Aldermen

Notes

References 

Orders of precedence
Government of Brazil